United Kingdom elections, 2016 refers to several elections that took place in the United Kingdom on Thursday 5 May 2016, at subnational and local level. Elections on that day are:
 
Local elections in England
Scottish Parliament election
Welsh Assembly election
Northern Ireland Assembly election
London Assembly election
Bristol mayoral election
London mayoral election
Liverpool mayoral election
Salford mayoral election
Police and crime commissioner elections in England and Wales
Ogmore by-election
Sheffield Brightside and Hillsborough by-election

See also
National referendum on the United Kingdom's membership of the European Union, held on 23 June 2016